Cheongna Hill Station is a station of Daegu Subway Line 2 and Line 3 in Daesin-dong, Dongsan-dong, and Namsan-dong, Jung District, Daegu, South Korea.

Around the station 
 Seomun Market
 Keimyung University Dongsan Medical Center
 Seomun Market Station

External links 
  Cyber station information from Daegu Metropolitan Transit Corporation

Daegu Metro stations
Jung District, Daegu
Railway stations opened in 2005